The Jamestown Canal bypasses a non-navigable section of the River Shannon between Jamestown and Drumsna in Ireland.
The canal is 2.6 km in length and is located in County Roscommon.
The Shannon Commissioners constructed the canal in 1848 to replace an earlier, smaller canal as part of a widescale upgrade of the Shannon Navigation.

Structures associated with the canal
The following associated structures are listed as being of architectural social and technical interest on the National Inventory of Architectural Heritage.
 Albert lock (1848) and lock keepers cottage.
Jamestown Canal Bridge, rusticated bridge with a single span over the canal, built about 1850.

Route

References

River Shannon
Canals in Ireland
Canals opened in 1799
Canals opened in 1848